Asa Burr Woodward (March 31, 1830 – July 26, 1921) was a member of the Connecticut Senate representing the 12th District from 1871 to 1873, a member of the Connecticut House of Representatives representing Norwalk from 1867 to 1869, and a Warden of the Borough of Norwalk in 1872.

He was born March 31, 1830, the son of Lucius and Lucia Burr Woodward.

He graduated from Yale College in 1853.

He worked in the law office of Orris S. Ferry. He was admitted to the bar in 1857.

He was a judge of probate for the Norwalk district beginning in 1878.

He served as President of the Fairfield County Savings Bank, a director of the South Norwalk Trust Company, and President of the Fairfield County Bar Association.

In 1902, he was a member of the Connecticut Constitutional Convention.

References

1830 births
1921 deaths
Connecticut state court judges
Republican Party Connecticut state senators
Mayors of Norwalk, Connecticut
People from Watertown, Connecticut
Republican Party members of the Connecticut House of Representatives
Yale College alumni